Charles A. Sullivan was a lawyer who served as a state legislator in Mississippi during the Reconstruction era. He served in the Mississippi House of Representatives. The Clarion-Ledger identified him has a Radical Republican state senator-elect.

References

External links
Findagrave entry

Members of the Mississippi House of Representatives